Tabet (Arabic: تابت) is a surname found in Lebanon, as well as Algeria, Morocco, Venezuela, the United States, and Brazil. Notable people with the surname include:

 André Tabet (1902–1981), French-Algerian screenwriter
 Antonio Pedro Tabet (born 1974), Brazilian comedian
 Ayoub Tabet (1884–1974), Lebanese Protestant politician
 Charles Tabet (born 1987), American professional basketball player
 Georges Tabet (1905–1984), French Algerian actor, musician and screenwriter
 Maia Tabet, Lebanese literary translator (Arabic to English), editor, and journalist
 Maurice Tabet (1919–2014), Lebanese sports shooter
 Miguel Ángel Tábet (1941–2020), Venezuelan theologian, Catholic priest, author, and exegete
 Mohammed Tabet (1929–1993), Moroccan serial rapist and former police commissioner
 Nadim Tabet (born 1982), Lebanese filmmaker
 Paul Fouad Tabet (1929–2009), Lebanese prelate of the Maronite Church
 Paul Marwan Tabet (born 1960), Lebanese-born Canadian Bishop of the Maronite Catholic Eparchy of Saint Maron of Montreal
 Phillip Tabet (born 1987), Lebanese professional basketball player
 Rayyane Tabet (born 1983), Lebanese contemporary visual artist, sculptor
 Sabri Tabet (born 1977), Algerian football player
 Sylvio Tabet, Lebanese filmmaker and film producer

See also 
 Plateau Tabet, another name for Beirut
 Sidi Thabet, also known as Sidi Tabet, commune and town in Tunisia
 Thabet

surnames
Arabic-language surnames